Hubei University of Arts and Science, formerly known as Xiangyang Normal College, is located in Xiangyang City, Hubei Province, in Central China. It is located at 296 County Rd, Xiangcheng Qu, Xiangyang Shi, Hubei Sheng, China.

History 

Hubei University of Arts and Science has a history of more than 110 years, and is the predecessor of Xiangyang Normal College founded in 1905. It is located in Xiangyang city, a national historical and cultural city (home town of Zhuge Liang) and the second largest city of Hubei Province.

Infrastructure  

The university covers an area of 943.9 thousand square meters, with a building area of 526.6 thousand square meters. It has 16 colleges, offering 52 undergraduate majors in the fields of medicine, engineering, industry, trade, management, law, education, literature and the arts.

Academic staff 

At present 18,000 students are enrolled. The university has a teaching and administrative staff of 1537, with 947 full-time teachers, including 120 professors and 312 associate professors.

Library and teaching facilities 

The library has 185.32 million copies of paper books and 2830GB electronic books. The university has 50 various types of laboratories, 160 multimedia classrooms and 250 internal and external training bases.

Colleges and schools 

Hubei University of Arts and Science has more than 16 colleges, offering 52 undergraduate majors.
 Medical College
 College of Education
 Foreign Language College
 College of Civil Engineering
 Radio and Television College
 College of Math and Computer Science
 College of Electronic and Info Engineering
 College of Economics and Political science
 College of Music
 College of Fine arts
 College of Liberal arts
 College of Electrical Engineering
 College of Management Marketing
 College of Mechanical Engineering
 College of Architectural Engineering
 College of Food and Chemical Engineering

Medical College 

The Medical College of Hubei University of Arts and Science building has a total construction area of 19,000 m2. The college is equipped with a basic medicine teaching laboratory, clinical and nursing skill training center and scientific research experiment platform. The college has a staff of 121 people. At present the medical college is offering two undergraduate programs:

  MBBS (Bachelor of Medicine and Bachelor of Surgery), total duration six years, English medium
 Nursing, four years, Chinese medium

Affiliated hospitals 

Xiangyang City Hospital (affiliated hospital of Hubei College of Arts and Sciences) was founded in 1949. It is a provincial regional medical center and has a total of construction area of 22 million square meters with 2956 beds. The hospital has a staff of 2952 people.

International recognition 

Hubei University of Arts and Science is recognized worldwide, as per the list of WHO, IMED and Avicena published in 2007. It is one of the universities approved to teach MBBS to foreign students.

External links 

 Official website

Universities and colleges in Hubei
Educational institutions established in 1905
1905 establishments in China
Xiangyang